Platial was a collaborative, user generated, cartographic website. It was founded in 2004 by Di-Ann Eisnor, Jake Olsen, and Jason Wilson. Platial, Inc. was headquartered in Portland, Oregon.

Platial was used by hundreds of thousands of people globally to share and associate relevant content with geographic places of interest. Platial claims 25% of the web's map widgets, used on over 10,000 sites.

On October 18, 2007, Platial acquired Frappr!, another social mapping website, increasing its total user-generated locations to more than 100 million.

On February 27, 2010 Platial announced that the service would be closing down within a few days.

In the Geographic Information Science literature, the concept of 'platial' refers to place-based studies in parallel with the use of 'spatial' for space-based (coordinate-system oriented) studies.

References

External links

Official Platial weblog

Web services
Organizations based in Portland, Oregon
Internet properties established in 2004
Privately held companies based in Oregon
2004 establishments in Oregon